Budhabare is a village development committee in Dhankuta District in the Koshi Zone of eastern Nepal. At the time of the 1991 Nepal census it had a population of 1954.

References

Populated places in Dhankuta District